Riptide is a series of short story anthologies published by Dirt Pie Press, based within the University of Exeter. The founding editors are Ginny Baily and Sally Flint. The journal includes submissions from writers that are both previously published and unpublished. Notable authors whose work has appeared in previous editions include Michael Morpurgo, Helen Dunmore, and Philip Hensher.

External links

Publications established in 2007
Series of books
2007 establishments in England